Arderancheh (also Romanized as Ārderāncheh; also known as Ardāncheh) is a village in Hombarat Rural District, in the Central District of Ardestan County, Isfahan Province, Iran. At the 2006 census, its population was 26, in 12 families.

References 

Populated places in Ardestan County